The Empire of Great Fulo, also known as the Denanke Kingdom or Denianke Kingdom, was a Pulaar kingdom of Senegal, which dominated the Futa Tooro region. Its population dominated its neighbors through use of cavalry and fought wars against the Mali and Songhai empires.

Tenguella (1490–1512)
The state began as a violent migration of Fula nomads from Futa Djallon into the Gambia led by Tenguella, their first king or mansa, in 1490.  His attack was directed against the remaining Atlantic provinces of the Mali Empire.  Though without a fixed headquarters, Tenguella's following grew so large that he was referred to as the "Great king of the Fulos" or the "Great Fulo" in Portuguese documents of the same period. From the Gambia he led his forces northeast against the growing Songhai Empire where he was defeated and killed in 1512. Afterwards, power was passed to his son, Koli Tenguella.

Koli Tenguella (1512–1537)
Koli Tenguella redirected the fledgling state's military away from Songhai towards the Jolof Empire with great success. The growth of the empire of Great Fulo would hasten the breakup of the Jolof state into several warring kingdoms. This was followed by attacks on Mali's Bambuk goldfields, which resulted in another serious defeat for the Fula. Koli died in 1537.  By then, a fixed capital had been settled in Anyam-Godo in what is today Senegal's Futa Toro region.

Denanke successors
The mangas that followed Koli Tengella were all descended from him and given the name Denyanke or Deny Kobe.  The Denianke dynasty (or Denyanke dynasty) continued to be a major power in the region ruling as animist monarchs over an increasingly Islamic populace from the 16th century into the late 18th century.  Their dynasty was overthrown through conflict with the increasingly Muslim subjects of the realm, leading to the Imamate of Futa Toro led by Abd-el-Kadr Toorodi in 1776, ushering in a near continuous era of Muslim Fula rule over the region.

The Sila Tigi or Manga of the Denianke dynasty were:
 Dengella Koli I (1513–1535)
 Dengella Koli II (1535–1538)
 15 rulers unknown by name (1538–1765)
 Sule-Budu (1765–1776)

See also
Imamate of Futa Toro
Military history of the Mali Empire
Jolof Empire
History of Senegal

Sources

References

External links
http://www.san.beck.org/1-13-Africa1500-1800.html
https://web.archive.org/web/20060321172333/http://www.jamtan.com/jamtan/fulani.cfm?chap=4&linksPage=329
http://www.jamtan.com/jamtan/fulani.cfm?chap=2&linksPage=214

Kingdoms of Senegal
Countries in precolonial Africa
Sahelian kingdoms
Former empires
Former empires in Africa
Former countries in Africa
States and territories established in 1490
States and territories disestablished in 1776
Former monarchies of Africa